Motojirō, Motojiro or Motojirou (written: 基次郎, 元次郎 or 元二郎) is a masculine Japanese given name. Notable people with the name include:

, Japanese general
, Japanese writer
, Japanese politician and businessman

Japanese masculine given names